The 2005 (May) Betfred Premier League was a professional non-ranking snooker tournament that was played from 6 January to 8 May 2005. This was the first Premier League event to use the shot clock.

Ronnie O'Sullivan won in the final 6–0 against Mark Williams.


Prize fund 
The breakdown of prize money for this year is shown below:
Winner: £50,000
Runner-up: £25,000
Semi-final: £12,500
Frame-win: £1,000
Century break: £1,000
Total: £250,000

League phase

Top four qualified for the play-offs. If points were level then most frames won determined their positions. If two players had an identical record then the result in their match determined their positions. If that ended 3–3 then the player who got to three first was higher. (Breaks above 50 shown between (parentheses), century breaks shown in bold.)

 6 January – Sands Centre, Carlisle, England
 Jimmy White 3–3 Stephen Hendry → 34–75, (50) 52–28, 70–25, (58) 67–9, 0–77 (76), 22–94
 Steve Davis 1–5 Marco Fu → 14–97, 27–75, 10–63, 14–66 (58), (76)–30, 47–71 (64)
 13 January – Charter Hall, Colchester, England
 Mark Williams 5–1 Paul Hunter → 74–17, 40–85, (111)–14, 70–32, (104)–0, (106) 122–0
 Ronnie O'Sullivan 2–4 Jimmy White → 60–52, 0–71 (62), 1–(73), 6–(77), 35–78, (77)–41
 27 January – Rothes Hall, Glenrothes, Scotland
 Stephen Hendry 4–2 Marco Fu → 7–114 (102), 80–19, (72) 73–5, (93) 94–0, (112) 124–13, 55–71 (51)
 Mark Williams 4–2 Steve Davis → (61) 76–0, 59–29, 15–64, 40–55, (58) 63–0, (62) 105–0
 10 February – Glades Arena, Kidderminster, England
 Ronnie O'Sullivan 4–2 Paul Hunter → 50–69, 70–38, (83) 101–3, (83)–0, 51–68, 63–49
 Jimmy White 2–4 Marco Fu → 7–59, 10–112 (93), 26–64 (63), (68) 81–0, 11–60, 72–37
 24 February – The Anvil, Basingstoke, England
 Ronnie O'Sullivan 3–3 Steve Davis → 0–108 (76), (67) 80–32, 91–32, 8–68, 72–(63), 13–(123)
 Stephen Hendry 5–1 Paul Hunter → 72–60 (52), (66) 70–(59), (60)–68 (62), 78–25, 71–70, (130)–0
 3 March – Assembly Rooms, Derby, England
 Mark Williams 4–2 Jimmy White → 7–(118), 66–33, 74–7, 24–73 (70), (73) 110–0, (97)–8
 Ronnie O'Sullivan 4–2 Stephen Hendry → 0–(80), 86–4, (95)–1, 2–82, (67) 72–1, 73–32
 17 March – King's Hall, Stoke-on-Trent, England
 Jimmy White 3–3 Steve Davis → 0–121 (93), (105)–4, 18–61, (82) 90–4, 54–63, (92)–0
 Ronnie O'Sullivan 3–3 Marco Fu → 0–90 (84), 78–25, 75–56, 4–100 (92), 77–64 (59), 4–128 (110)
 24 March – Magnum Centre, Irvine, Scotland
 Mark Williams 3–3 Stephen Hendry → 0–(88), (52) 62–34, (108) 139–5, 24–93, (73)–(64), 14–59
 Paul Hunter 2–4 Steve Davis → (60) 67–74, 38–77 (51), 13–95 (50), 58–67, 66–45, (88)–6
 7 April – Corn Exchange, Ipswich, England
 Mark Williams 1–5 Marco Fu → 16–74 (62), 53–(65), 29–68 (64), (103)–25, 56–67, 0–(133)
 Ronnie O'Sullivan 4–2 Mark Williams → (78)–4, 0–76, (63) 78–37, 60–25, 30–(108), (132)–0
 14 April – The Dome, Doncaster, England
 Paul Hunter 3–3 Jimmy White → 34–66, 6–70, 44–79, 67–52, (50) 72–1, 61–46
 Stephen Hendry 4–2 Steve Davis → 10–99 (85), 37–70, (55) 68–24, (66) 86–35, (76)–1, 71–43
 Paul Hunter 3–3 Marco Fu → 4–80 (63), (106) 110–5, 13–78, 64–33, 65–59, 15–62

Play-offs 
7–8 May – G-Mex, Manchester, England

* 34–71 (55), 0–68, 0–134 (124), 15–61, 9–(73)
** 36–61, 38–85 (78), 6–74, 8–(121), 33–81
*** 52–70, 19–(75), 0–(134), 1–(71), 34–60, 0–(95)

Century breaks
Each century break was worth a £1,000 per break.

134, 132, 121  Ronnie O'Sullivan
133, 110, 102  Marco Fu
130, 112  Stephen Hendry
124, 111, 108, 108, 106, 104, 103  Mark Williams
123  Steve Davis
118, 105  Jimmy White
106  Paul Hunter

References

2005 1
Premier League 2004
Premier League Snooker 2004